Murexsul planiliratus is a species of sea snail, a marine gastropod mollusk in the family Muricidae, the murex snails or rock snails.

Description
The length of the shell attains 13.35 mm.

Distribution
This marine species occurs off Sri Lanka.

References

 Bozzetti, L., 2007. Ocinebrina lucasi (Gastropoda: Muricidae) nuova specie dallo Sri Lanka meridionale. Malacologia Mostra Mondiale 55: 12

External links
 Reeve, L. A. (1845–1849). Monograph of the genus Murex. In: Conchologia Iconica: or, illustrations of the shells of molluscous animals, vol. 3, pls 1-37 and unpaginated text. L. Reeve & Co., London
 Brazier, J. (1894). A new Murex from South Australia. Proceedings of the Linnean Society of New South Wales. 18: 179–180
 Lamarck, [J.-B. M.] de. (1822). Histoire naturelle des animaux sans vertèbres. Tome septième. Paris: published by the Author, 711 pp

Muricidae
Gastropods described in 1845